An Opele (spelled Opuele or Ocuele in Latin America) is a divination chain used in traditional African and Afro-American religions, notably in Ifá and Yoruba tradition.

A Babalawo (diviner) uses the Opele in order to communicate with the deity of wisdom/knowledge in the Yoruba tradition (Orunmila), who is able to identify the causes and solutions to personal and collective problems and restore harmony in the person's life through re-balancing of the person's destiny and/or Ori (personal deity).  The Opele is the minor divination tool used by Babalawos for Ifa divination; it is believed to be an "assistant" or "slave" of Orunmila, who communicates Orunmila's desires to the Babalawo and from the Babalawo back to Orunmila.  It is used for the majority of daily divination work.  For divination regarding important ceremonial revelations or life-long information about a client or for very important decisions, Babalawos elect to use their Ikin seeds, which they consider to be the physical representation of Orunmila himself.

References

Religious objects
 
Yoruba culture
Yoruba words and phrases
Traditional African religions
Afro-American religion
Divination
Yoruba art